Miloco Studios are a group of recording studios based in London, England.

History
Miloco was formed out of the merging of three former London recording studios: Milo Music, The Garden and Orinoco Studios.

Milo Music began in 1984 as a small studio in east London's Hoxton Square (the studio is commonly referred to as simply 'The Square'), which was used by the likes of Tricky, M People and The Brand New Heavies in the early years of its life. In the early nineties they took over another building nearby to The Square and used it to build seven programming suites for artists and producers to use for long-term periods. Today, Miloco still operate five of the seven rooms, and people filling them currently include pop producer Richard X and Swing Out Sister.

The Garden studio, located in the Shoreditch area of East London, was built in 1981 by John Foxx and studio designer Andy Munro. It became a regular choice of studios for the likes of Siouxsie and the Banshees, The Cure and Depeche Mode, as well as Matt Johnson of The The who ended up buying the studio for himself. Milo Music became the studio's representative from the mid-1990s, when for the first time The Garden was run as a commercial enterprise.

Orinoco Studios, located at 36 Leroy Street in Elephant and Castle, was founded in the mid-1980s with two studios: The Engine Room and The Toyshop Programming Studio. They came to prominence in 1988 with the release of Enya's Orinoco-produced Watermark album, which included the hit "Orinoco Flow", apparently named after the studios. Orinoco was part of both the dance explosion of the late 1980s, and the indie and Britpop era of the early to mid-nineties. The studio's top-end Neve mix room (known as The Engine Room) has always been integral to Orinoco's appeal, and since the early 1990s bands such as Oasis and The Chemical Brothers mixed groundbreaking albums such as (What's the Story) Morning Glory? (1995) and Dig Your Own Hole (1997) respectively, in The Engine Room. Seven of the Chemical Brothers’ albums have been mixed in the room, and the electronic act also regularly used The Toyshop programming room, which shares the same building as The Engine Room.

When Milo Music bought Orinoco in 2000, the Miloco name was created. 2006 saw Miloco open three new studios. The first was the former Innovation Studios on Highbury Corner in North London, renamed ‘The Yard’ after the road on which it is, Swan Yard. After opening The Yard came the addition of dance producer and DJ Pete Heller's Kentish Town studio, Musikbox, and then producer Ben Hillier built a unique live tracking studio in the former Orinoco building, which is now called The Pool.

Under the leadership of Nick Young, 2007 and 2008 saw the company expand considerably further, forming partnerships with various established producers and recording artists to re-open a number of formerly private studios as commercial ones.  The first room added during this expansion period was legendary producer Hugh Padgham's, Sofa Sound Studios in west London, which Miloco took over in the summer of 2007. At the start of 2008, Miloco unveiled their very first residential studio, El Cortijo, which they opened in partnership with studio owner and session drummer Trevor Morais. Based in a 7-bedroom Andalucian villa, El Cortijo became the first facility Miloco opened outside of the UK; however, the studio closed in 2013 and El Cortijo is now solely used as a luxury holiday villa. In summer 2008 Miloco opened a new tracking studio in the Battery Studios complex in Willesden Green, Battery Studio 2, in collaboration with British rock producers and studio owners Flood and Alan Moulder. Flood and Alan's SSL mix studio, Battery Studio 1, which is also located at the Battery Studios Complex, came under the Miloco umbrella a year later in the summer of 2009. That year, Robbie Weston and Rick Dzendzera's The Bridge Facilities, originally located at No. 55 Great Marlborough Street in Soho, London, was sold to Miloco, and relocated to the Orinoco Complex, where it was renamed The Bridge Writing Studio.

In 2007 Miloco set up a sister company, Interface, a studio engineer and producer management company. The Interface roster currently manages the following UK-based engineers and producers: Pete Hofmann, Finn Eiles, Matt Hyde, Matt Foster, Ferg Peterkin, Joe Hirst and Ben Thackeray.

The first UK residential studio facility Miloco opened was Fisher Lane Studios near the town of Guildford in Surrey, which came under Miloco operation in the Autumn of 2008. Since the early 1980s, the studio has been known for its association with bands and artists such as Genesis, Phil Collins, Eric Clapton, The Cure and Mike + The Mechanics. Under the new representation of Miloco, Fisher Lane has been developed into the closest rural residential recording studio to London, having acquired two 4-bedroom cottages next-door to the studio. In 2009, another rural residential facility near Brackley in Northamptonshire was made available for bookings via Miloco after the late producer and former Jamiroquai keyboardist Toby Smith converted two barn buildings into Angelic Studios. Set within Halse Copse Farm an hour north of London, Angelic has been described as "without question one of the finest residential recording spaces in the UK." Bands that have recorded at Angelic include Mumford & Sons, The Hoosiers, Everything Everything, and The 1975.

The Garden Studio in Holywell Lane was demolished in autumn 2013.

The Engine Room studio was rebranded as The Red Room London in 2015. Shortly after, in early 2016, Miloco's first studio The Square located in Hoxton Square closed permanently. Three new studios were opened in September 2015, Bieger Sound in Berlin, Greystoke Studio in London and Grouse Lodge in Ireland.

Miloco Studios became popular amongst local London grime artists. In 2016 Skepta recorded and mixed his album Konnichiwa, which was awarded the Mercury Prize that same year. Emeli Sandé worked on her second album Long Live the Angels (2016) at Miloco as well. Sandé won Best Female at the 2017 BRIT Awards following the album's release.

In October 2016, The Bridge Writing Studio upgraded their equipment.

Artists 

Well-known artists who have worked at Miloco studios include:

Adele
Alphabeat
Arctic Monkeys
Audio Bullys
Badly Drawn Boy
Beth Orton
Björk
Black Kids
Bloc Party
Coldplay
Crashcarburn
Crystal Castles
Dizzee Rascal
DJ Ironik
DJ Shadow
Editors
Elastica
Enya
Florence and the Machine
Foals
Frank Carter & The Rattlesnakes
Franz Ferdinand
Full Body Anchor
Funeral for a Friend
Gallows
Glasvegas
Groove Armada
Idlewild
Jamie T
Jarvis Cocker
Kasabian
Kate Nash
Lannon
Late of the Pier
Liberty X
The Long Blondes
Luke Haines
Madness
Mark Ronson
Mystery Jets
Nick Cave and the Bad Seeds
Noel Gallagher
Oasis
Rachel Stevens
Razorlight
Roots Manuva
Sam Smith
Spiritualized
Sugababes
The Auteurs
The Chemical Brothers
The Futureheads
The Horrors
The Hours
The Magic Gang
The Prodigy
The Rascals
These New Puritans
Trivium
Turin Brakes
Twelfth Night
Unkle
Viva Brother

Albums

2008 Miloco albums include 

Bloc Party – Intimacy
Sugababes – Catfights and Spotlights
The King Blues – Save the World. Get the Girl
Roll Deep – Return of the Big Money Sound
Trivium – Shogun
DJ Ironik – No Point in Wasting Tears
Will Young – Let It Go
The Metros – More Money Less Grief
Slipknot – All Hope Is Gone
Late of the Pier – Fantasy Black Channel
Sparkadia – Postcards
Black Kids – Partie Traumatic
The Rascals – Rascalize
Coldplay – Viva la Vida or Death and All His Friends
The Music – Strength in Numbers
Alphabeat – This Is Alphabeat
Spiritualized – Songs in A&E
Adem – Takes
Hadouken! – Music for an Accelerated Culture
Crystal Castles – Crystal Castles
The Long Blondes – Couples
Foals – Antidotes
Mystery Jets – Twenty One
Nick Cave and the Bad Seeds – Dig, Lazarus, Dig!!!
Adele – 19
These New Puritans – Beat Pyramid
Bullet for My Valentine – Scream Aim Fire
British Sea Power – Do You Like Rock Music?

Past Miloco albums include 

Kate Nash – Made of Bricks
Arctic Monkeys – Favourite Worst Nightmare
Newton Faulkner – Hand Built by Robots
The Horrors – Strange House
The Chemical Brothers – We Are the Night
Shitdisco – Kingdom of Fear
Roll Deep – Rules and Regulations
The Maccabees – Colour It In
Mr Hudson and the Library – A Tale of Two Cities
Battle – Break the Banks
Enya – Watermark
Oasis – (What's the Story) Morning Glory?
Ash – 1977
The Chemical Brothers – Dig Your Own Hole
Depeche Mode – Construction Time Again
Roots Manuva – Awfully Deep
Audio Bullys – Ego War
The Cure – The Top
M.I.A. – Arular 
Richard X – Richard X Presents His X-Factor Vol. 1
The Auteurs – How I Learned to Love the Bootboys
Gene – Olympian
Jarvis Cocker - Jarvis
Fionn Regan - The End of History
Black Box Recorder - The Facts of Life
Plan B - Who Needs Actions When You Got Words
Shed Seven - Ladyman
Luke Haines - Das Capital
The 57th Dynasty - The Spoken Word

References

External links 
 Official Miloco Site

Recording studios in London